Taoudi is a town in northeastern Ivory Coast. It is a sub-prefecture of Bondoukou Department in Gontougo Region, Zanzan District.

Taoudi was a commune until March 2012, when it became one of 1126 communes nationwide that were abolished.

In 2014, the population of the sub-prefecture of Taoudi was 18,568.

Villages
The twelve villages of the sub-prefecture of Taoudi and their population in 2014 are:

Notes

Sub-prefectures of Gontougo
Former communes of Ivory Coast